Bulyak (Büläk) is a rural locality (a village) in Tuchubayevsky Selsoviet, Baltachevsky District, Bashkortostan, Russia. The population was 20 as of 2010. There is 1 street.

Geography 
Bulyak is located 26 km northwest of Starobaltachevo (the district's administrative centre) by road. Tykanovo is the nearest rural locality.

References 

Rural localities in Baltachevsky District